Kjeld or Ketil (1100–1150) was a 12th-century Danish clergyman. He is venerated as a saint in Denmark, by both Catholics and Danish Lutherans.

Life
Kjeld was born in the early 12th century to wealthy parents, who lived on a farm in the Randers area. He was a godly boy, and it was soon decided that he should have a future in the church. He was sent to Viborg, where he joined the cathedral chapter at the cathedral. The cathedral chapter was the place where priests were trained and while they lived as canons at the cathedral they were in charge of the worship services at the cathedral, and assisted the bishop in his administrative work. The Canons Regula lived in a community following Augustine's Rule and they were led by a dean.

Kjeld thrived in the cathedral chapter, where he was elected as head of the cathedral chapter school and around 1145 he was elected dean of the other canons. Kjeld was apparently a very caring, generous, and compassionate man who gave all he managed for the sick, poor, and needy. It is told in his biography that when Viborg city in 1145 was threatened by fire, Kjeld ran to the tower of the cathedral, where he prayed fervently to God to spare the city and the church, after which the fire raging slowed noticeably.

Despite the fact that the canons had chosen Kjeld as their dean, there soon came disputes between them and him, apparently because they did not like his generous distribution of the cathedral chapter funds to the poor. The canons elected a new dean and Kjeld moved to Aalborg for a while. Though Kjeld was popular in Aalborg he longed for spreading the Christian faith and the ability to achieve martyrdom among the Wends. He went on a pilgrimage to Rome, where he visited the tombs of the Apostles and had an audience with Pope Eugene III (1145-1153). He sought the pope's permission to go on a mission among the Wends, but although he got the authorization, the Pope expressed that he would rather see Kjeld return to Viborg and continue his work as dean of the cathedral chapter. The Pope wrote to the cathedral chapter who had to bow and take Kjeld back. But soon after, in 1150, Kjeld died in Viborg and was buried in the cathedral.

Cult
Some time after, stories of miracles at Kjeld grave began to spread. The sick became healthy after visits to the tomb, and the blind especially seem to have benefited from a visit to the tomb; according to the saint's biography at least twelve people had their sight restored. The church authorities now wanted to get Kjeld canonized and they therefore sent a request to the Pope in Rome. In 1188 Pope Clement III (1187-1191) consented, and the Archbishop Absalon celebrated Kjeld's beatification locally, which occurred on July 11, 1189.

St. Kjeld is also called Ketillus (a variation on his name) and also sometimes Exuperian, after a name he took upon ordination to the priesthood. He has also been called the "St. Francis of Assisi of the North."

The center of the cult of Saint Kjeld was the cathedral in Viborg. Here they had a Saint Kjeld chapel with a Saint Kjeld altar and a shrine with a reliquary called "Saint Kjeld's Ark." Annually they celebrated his feast in the city on the 11th of July with processions, religious services, and a large market. Other Danish cities venerated St. Kjeld as well, and in Aarhus at the Cathedral there was also a Saint Kjeld altar.

The "Saint Kjeld Ark" was destroyed in 1726 when most of Viborg city, including the cathedral, was destroyed by a large fire. However, in Viborg cathedral is still the "Saint Kjeld Well" in the crypt's southern chapel, which is the spot where Kjeld was initially buried.

In Viborg a Saint Kjeld Church parish was inaugurated in 1966 as a focal point for the Roman Catholic church in central and western Jutland, and later became the present Saint Kjeld Church built on the same property in 2008.

References
Viborg History: Prehistory-1726 (Mette Iversen et al., published by the Municipality of Viborg 1998)
Saint Kjeld: Food and miracles (published by Henning Høirup 1961)

External links
Viborgdomkirke.dk
Viborgpilgrimscenturm.dk

Danish Roman Catholic saints
12th-century Danish people
12th-century Roman Catholic clergy
People from Randers
People from Viborg Municipality
Medieval Danish saints